The 2016 LEN Super Cup was the 35th edition of the annual trophy organised by LEN and contested by the reigning champions of the two European competitions for men's water polo clubs. The match took place between Croatian side VK Jug (2015–16 European Champions) and Italian side AN Brescia (Euro Cup's holder) at the Gruž City Pool in Dubrovnik, Croatia, on 14 December 2016.

The teams already faced each other in the 2006 edition. Jug defeated Brescia as it happened 10 years before and won the trophy for the second time, while the Italian team lost the Super Cup final for the third time in its history.

Teams

Squads

Head coach: Vjekoslav Kobeščak

Head coach: Alessandro Bovo

Match

See also
 2016 Women's LEN Super Cup

References

External links
 Official LEN website

LEN Super Cup
S
LEN